Ukrainian Socialist-Revolutionary Party was a political party in Ukraine and the Russian Republic founded in April 1917, based on separate groups and circles of SRs that existed on the territory of Ukraine since 1905. The left faction of the party dissolved it in 1918 forming a new party, while the Ukrainian Socialist-Revolutionary Party was recreated in January 1919 by its moderate faction members.

General outlook
It was one of the most influential political parties in Ukraine as it was representing the interest of the major social class of Ukraine - peasants and in some extent soldiers. It closely cooperated with the All-Ukrainian Peasants Society (Spilka) on which the party relied its activities among farmworkers. The party's program was based on unifying principles of national interests and ideas of liberal populism. The determining issue of revolutionary change, it considered the national question, and its ultimate goal was to build an sovereign Ukrainian independent state. In November 1917 the Ukrainian Socialist-Revolutionary Party consisted of 75,000 members.

Ideas and principles
 National personal autonomy for minorities
 Classless Ukrainian nation
 Communization of great arable lands
 Promoting principles of tenant farmers and farmworkers

History
In the fall of 1906 the Simferopol circle of the Party established its new affiliations in Volyn and Podolie. The first organizations of the party appeared in the eastern region of the modern Ukraine: Kiev Governorate, Chernigov Governorate, Odessa Governorate, Poltava Governorate, and others.

The First Party Conference took place in Kiev (February 1907) where the Party Central Committee (CC) was elected. However, already in August 1907 numerous of the Party's members were arrested and the CC was liquidated. The one who managed to escape prosecution has moved to Lviv (autonomous region of Kingdom of Galicia and Lodomeria). In 1910-1911 there were attempts to reestablish the organization in Kiev and Kharkiv. Although it was not until the 1913 when some of the Party underground organization have reappeared in Ukraine. Around 1914 the Kievan group of the Party published its program in the magazine Borotba (the Fight).

First steps
The Party officially was established on April 17, 1917 in Kiev. The first Party Constituent Congress took place on May 4, 1917 in Kiev as well where the party became officially the All-national. The second Party Congress took place on July 15–16, 1917 when the Party program and statutes were accepted. According to their rivals from the Ukrainian Social-Democratic Labor Party, the Party has rewritten its program from their colleagues the Socialist Revolutionary Party. The Party press-media became the newspaper Narodna Volia (The People's Will) and the magazine Borotba. The Party obtain 50% of all votes in Ukraine to the Russian Constituent Assembly.

The Party had several of its ministers in the General Secretariat of Ukraine, but after the IV Universal on January 30, 1918 the Party became in charge of the government splitting only couple of other ministries with SDeks. Already in June 1917 several radical leaders of the Party held a conference at the Left-bank Ukraine where they declared their disagreement with the Party's center course. After the October Revolution, the party's taken energetic measures not to allow strengthening of Soviets in Ukraine. Since the establishment of the Central Council of Ukraine (Rada), the party received majority in the parliament, while number of its member participated in the government of Ukraine. It was not until January 1918 when the Ukrainian Socialist Revolutionary Party became the nation's ruling party.

Parliamentary life
A crisis arose in December 1917 during one of the sessions of the Central Rada (7th and 8th (December 1917)) where the parliamentarians could not agree on the agrarian question. The majority of agrarian deputies were absolutely against the conservative agrarian law projects of the social-federalists K.Matskevich and SDPist Borys Martos who were supported by part of SRs.

At the 3rd Party Congress in December 1917 the left SRs with the support of deputies from the military political organizations requested from the Central Rada promptly to issue laws about the liquidation of private property and estates in particular, communization of series of various industries, and several other reforms that were part of the Party's program. Soon 12 members of the Party CC composed the nucleus of the left opposition in the Rada.

After the Declaration of Independence a SR-government was formed (the Council of People's Ministers) headed by Vsevolod Holubovych. On January 18, 1918 under the influence of the Left-wing of the Party headed by O.Shumsky the Central Rada finally accepted a provisional decree about the socialization of estates. However, on January 26, 1918 Kiev was taken by the army of Mikhail Muravyov and the members of the Rada relocated to Zhytomyr.

There the Ukrainian left SRs were publishing their newspaper Molot (Hammer). With the support of the Germany Ukraine was liberated from the Russian occupation by March 1918. However, on April 29 the German military administration dispersed the Rada and arrested the Prime Minister of Ukraine Vsevolod Holubovych accusing him in setting up a conspiracy by kidnapping a financial official on April 25, 1918.

Split

At the 4th Party Congress on May 13–16, 1918 the party split into a left faction (Borbysts) and a right faction. The Right SR considered that the revolution was concluded and advocated for conducting a legal opposition to the government of Pavlo Skoropadsky. The Left SR propagated the Soviet form of power, demanded cooperation with Bolsheviks, advocated for the organization of underground resistance and preparation to an armed revolt against the Hetman of Ukraine. The Borbysts split away from the party and formed the Ukrainian Party of Left Socialist-Revolutionaries , which allied with the Bolsheviks.
In May 1918 another left-wing faction of the party (Borotbists) also split away, forming the Ukrainian Communist Party.

Exile 
The party supported the Ukrainian People's Republic during the Ukrainian War of Independence. After the Bolshevik victory and the establishment of the Ukrainian Soviet Socialist Republic, most of its members went into exile in Vienna and then Prague, where they published the newspaper Trudova Ukraina. In 1948, it took part in the establishment of the National Rada in Exile.

On 26 March 1950 it merged with the Ukrainian Social Democratic Labour Party and the Ukrainian Radical Socialist Party to form the Ukrainian Socialist Party.

Notable members
Left faction (Borbysts)
Mykhailo Hrushevsky, chairman of the Central Rada, member of the Mala Rada and the CC of the UPSR.
Vsevolod Holubovych
Pavlo Khrystiuk
Mykyta Shapoval
Fedir Shvets
Right faction (Borotbists)
Oleksandr Shumsky
Hryhoriy Hrynko
Vasyl Blakytnyy

References

1917 establishments in Ukraine
1918 disestablishments in Ukraine
1919 establishments in Ukraine
1930 disestablishments in Ukraine
Agrarian parties in Ukraine
Defunct socialist parties in Ukraine
Political parties disestablished in 1918
Political parties disestablished in 1930
Political parties established in 1917
Political parties established in 1919
Political parties of the Russian Revolution
Pro-independence parties in the Soviet Union
Socialist parties in the Soviet Union
Socialist Revolutionary Party
Ukrainian political parties in Imperial Russia